MoDo Hockey Dam are an ice hockey team in the Swedish Women's Hockey League (SDHL), the top flight of women's hockey in Sweden. They play in Örnsköldsvik, in the historical province of Ångermanland on the east coast of Sweden, at the Hägglunds Arena. The club's junior side, Modo Hockey 2, plays in the North division of the Damettan.

History  
The women's section of Modo Hockey was formed in 1968 under the name of Modo AIK, playing the first ever organised women's hockey match in Sweden against Timrå IK in 1969. As there was no organised league, the match was only a training match. The club finished in third place in the first official Swedish Championship, held in the 1987–88 season, and finished in second place a year later. The club would go on to become on the best in Sweden in the early 2000s, finishing in the playoff top-three for three consecutive years between 2000 and 2003, and eight years in a row between 2004 and 2012. The 2012 Riksserien season would also mark Modo's first-ever playoffs championship win.

In recent years, the club has suffered problems retaining top players, losing all-time top scorer Erika Grahm to Brynäs IF and American Olympian Sidney Morin to Linköping HC prior to the 2018, as well as defenceman Gracen Hirschy to Linköping HC in 2020. After the club finished in second place in the 2018–19 regular season and were eliminated in the playoff semi-finals by Linköping, the club's two top scorers as well as long-time defender Johanna Olofsson left. The club would then finish in 9th in the 2019–20 season, the first time that the club ever had to participate in the relegation playoffs. The club was able to defend their place in the SDHL after beating Skellefteå AIK 7–0 across two matches.

Season-by-season results 
This is a partial list of the most recent seasons completed by Modo Hockey.

Code explanation: GP—Games played; W—Wins (3 points); OTW—Overtime wins (2 points); OTL—Overtime losses (1 point); L—Losses; GF—Goals for; GA—Goals against; Pts—Points; Top Scorer: Points (Goals+Assists)

Players and personnel

2022–23 roster 

Coaching staff and team personnel
 Head coach: Jared Cipparone
 Assistant coach: Anton Söderqvist
 Assistant coach: Mikael Wågström
 Goaltending coach: Valentina Lizana
 Conditioning coach: Joakim Bäckström
 Head equipment manager: Fredric Larsson
 Physical therapist: Tobias Nordin

Team captaincy history 
 Frida Nevalainen, 2007–08
 Annie Svedin, 2008–09
 Erika Grahm, 2009–2018
 Olivia Carlsson, 2018–

Head coaches 
 Sture Andersson, 2003–2009
 Robert Elfving, 2009–10
 Jens Öhman, 2010–11
 Mikael Nilsson, 2011–2016
 Jens Öhman, 2016–17
 Björn Edlund, 2017–2022
 Jared Cipparone, 2022–

Franchise records and leaders

All-time scoring leaders 
The top-ten point-scorers (goals + assists) of Modo Hockey, through the completion of the 2020–21 season.

Note: Nat = Nationality; Pos = Position; GP = Games played; G = Goals; A = Assists; Pts = Points; P/G = Points per game;  = 2021–22 Modo Hockey player

References

External links 
 
 Team information and statistics from Eliteprospects.com and Eurohockey.com

Swedish Women's Hockey League teams
Ice hockey teams in Sweden
Women's ice hockey teams in Europe
Modo Hockey
Women's ice hockey in Sweden
Ice hockey teams in Västernorrland County